is a Japanese professional wrestler currently working as a freelancer. He is best known fot his tenures with Dramatic Dream Team (DDT) and Kaientai Dojo promotions.

Professional wrestling career

Independent circuit (2001-present)
Although some sources state that Urano had his first professional wrestling match on November 19, 2000, the first documented one was at a house show of the IWA Puerto Rico promotion from January 11, 2001, where he defeated Hiroki. He is known for his early tenure with Frontier Martial-Arts Wrestling where he wrestled in 2001 at events such as the FMW Super Dynamism 2001 from August 11 where he teamed up with Tomokazu Morita in a losing effort to Naohiko Yamazaki and Ricky Fuji. He wrestled a match for Wrestle-1 at Pro-Wrestling ACE Vol. 6 event on July 2, 2017, where he defeated Andromeda Ken. He wrestled a match for Ice Ribbon at Ice Ribbon Tax Pro Wrestling Vol. 5  on February 21, 2021, where he teamed up with Ram Kaicho and Onryo, falling short to Fuminori Abe, Koju Takeda and Taro Yamada in a six-man intergender tag team match. At 2AW Fujita Pro Wrestling School Performance ~ Winter Special Lesson 2020 on February 15, Urano teamed up with Yuko Miyamoto and Yuma to defeat Kyu Mogami, Shu Asakawa and Taishi Takizawa.

Dramatic Dream Team/DDT Pro Wrestling (2006-present)
Urano participated at Budokan Peter Pan on August 18, 2012, where he competed in 5 vs. 5 Soccer match, where he teamed up with Antonio Honda, Yuji Hino, Tanomusaku Toba and Yoshiko as Akira-waku FC and lost score 2–2 (2–0 on penalties) against Tonkatsu SC (Masa Takanashi, Daisuke Sasaki, Hoshitango, Tetsuya Endo and Tsukasa Fujimoto). At DDT Audience 2017 on May 28, Urano unsuccessfully challenged Konosuke Takeshita for the KO-D Openweight Championship. At DDT Sweet Dreams! 2017 on January 29, he unsuccessfully challenged All Japan Pro Wrestling's Keisuke Ishii for the AJPW World Junior Heavyweight Championship. Urano teamed up with Takato Nakano and Takumi Tsukamoto at DDT BASARA 105 ~ Manji No Kitsune 2 Hikime ~ on September 14, 2019 to defeat Sento Minzoku (Daiki Shimomura, Isami Kodaka and Ryuichi Sekine) to win the UWA World Trios Championship. Urano is a former multiple time Ironman Heavymetalweight Champion, title for which he latest competed at Judgement 2019: DDT 22nd Anniversary in a gauntlet battle royal against the winner Saki Akai, Yuka Sakazaki, El Lindaman, Asuka and others.

Championships and accomplishments
Dramatic Dream Team/DDT Pro-Wrestling
Ironman Heavymetalweight Championship (6 times)
Jiyūgaoka 6-Person Tag Team Championship (1 time) – with Kudo and Antonio Honda
KO-D Tag Team Championship (5 tmes) – with Yuji Hino (2), Gentaro (1), Kudo (1) and Harashima (1)Kaientai DojoStrongest-K Tag Team Championship (1 time) – with Handsome Joe
UWA World Middleweight Championship (2 times)Michinoku Pro WrestlingUWA World Tag Team Championship (1 time) – with HirokiPro-Wrestling Basara
UWA World Trios Championship (1 time) – with Takato Nakano and Takumi Tsukamoto

References 

1976 births
Living people
Japanese male professional wrestlers
People from Tokorozawa, Saitama
20th-century professional wrestlers
21st-century professional wrestlers
UWA World Trios Champions
UWA World Tag Team Champions
Ironman Heavymetalweight Champions
Jiyūgaoka 6-Person Tag Team Champions
KO-D Tag Team Champions
Strongest-K Tag Team Champions
UWA World Middleweight Champions